Robert Bylot was an English explorer who made four voyages to the Arctic. He was uneducated and from a working-class background, but was able to rise to rank of master in the English Royal Navy.

Voyages

Robert Bylot

First voyage, 1610–1611 
Bylot was first mate on the  during Henry Hudson's 1610–1611 expedition into what is now known as Hudson Bay. In the spring of 1611, Hudson wanted to continue the expedition, but the crew wanted to return home. There was discontent between the captain and members of the crew, and Bylot was stripped of his rank.

Later there was a mutiny in which Hudson, his son and several sailors were set adrift in an open boat in James Bay. It was due to Bylot's navigational skills that Discovery was able to return from the Arctic safely; Hudson and his party were never seen again. Upon return to England, Bylot was tried as a mutineer but was pardoned.

Second voyage, 1612–1613 
Bylot returned to Hudson Bay in 1612 with Sir Thomas Button. They wintered over at the mouth of the Nelson River, and in the spring of 1613, continued north. They were able to reach 65° N, then returned to England.

Northwest Passage

First voyage, 1615 
In 1615, the Muscovy Company hired Bylot to find the Northwest Passage as captain of Discovery. William Baffin was the pilot. They sailed west from Hudson Strait and were blocked by ice at Frozen Strait.

Second voyage, 1616 
The following year, the Muscovy Company again hired Bylot and Baffin to continue to search for the Northwest Passage. The voyage resulted in several notable achievements. First was the circumnavigation and mapping of what is now called Baffin Bay. Second was the discovery of Smith Sound, by which the North Pole would eventually be reached. Third was the discovery of Lancaster Sound, through which the Northwest Passage would eventually be found three centuries later.

Legacy 

Bylot and Baffin's work in Baffin Bay was doubted by cartographers back in England. As late as 1812, some charts of the area only showed a dotted bulge with the words: "Baffin's Bay according to the relation of W. Baffin in 1616, but not now believed."

When the bay was "rediscovered" by Sir John Ross in 1818, the records of the Bylot–Baffin voyage proved extremely accurate. In England, almost total credit for the discovery was given to Baffin, and Bylot was virtually ignored. Historian Farley Mowat speculated two possible reasons for this: Bylot's lack of education and lower position relative to Baffin in English society, and his involvement in the mutiny during Hudson's expedition.

Bylot Island, off the northern end of Baffin Island and one of the more dramatic of the Canadian Arctic islands, was named after him.

References

Footnotes

Bibliography

External links 
 

17th-century English people
17th-century explorers
Explorers of Canada
Explorers of the Arctic
People of the Muscovy Company
Recipients of English royal pardons